William Leggat Ritchie (1884 – 12 February 1966) was a Scottish professional golfer. His most successful year was 1910 when he tied for 16th place in the Open Championship and won the Perrier Water Assistant Professionals' Tournament.

Early life
Ritchie was born in 1884 in Aberdeen, Scotland.

Golf career
Ritchie's best season was 1910 while he was an assistant to James Braid at Walton Heath Golf Club. The opening day of the Open Championship was abandoned because of rain but, when play resumed the following day, Ritchie had rounds of 78 and 74 and was tied for 4th place at the end of the day. Rounds of 82 and 79 on the final day left him tied for 16th place. Later in the year Ritchie won the first Perrier Water Assistant Professionals' Tournament at Bushey Hall Golf Club. The prizes for this tournament were "presented by the proprietors of Perrier Water", the winner receiving 20 guineas (£21) and a gold watch. The event was organised like the News of the World Match Play with regional qualifying over 36 holes and a knock-out stage for the 16 qualifiers. Ritchie won the Southern section qualifying by a clear 7 strokes. Ritchie and Willie Watt, the Scottish qualifier, met in the final. Watt was 1 up after five holes but lost the next four holes. Ritchie also won the 11th and 13th and eventually won 5&4.

Following his successful season he became the professional at Worplesdon Golf Club in 1911. In 1922 he moved to Addington Golf Club. From 1935 he was at Selsdon Park Golf Club.

Death
Ritchie died in February 1966 aged 81. At the time he was living in Addiscombe near Croydon in south London.

Tournament wins
1910 Perrier Water Assistant Professionals' Tournament

Results in major championships

Note: Ritchie only played in The Open Championship.

NT = No tournament
WD = withdrew
CUT = missed the half-way cut
"T" indicates a tie for a place

Team appearances
England–Scotland Professional Match (representing Scotland): 1913

References

Scottish male golfers
Sportspeople from Aberdeen
1884 births
1966 deaths